Cândida Ivete Vargas Martins (17 July 1927 – 3 January 1984), commonly known as Ivete Vargas, was a Brazilian journalist and politician.

Political career and background

Ivete Vargas was the daughter of Newton Barbosa Tatsch and Cândida Vargas, niece of President Getúlio Vargas, during one of whose Presidencies her own political career had already begun. 

Ivete Vargas served multiple terms representing São Paulo as a Federal Deputy.

President of Brazilian Labour Party

From 1981 until her death in 1984, Ivete Vargas served as President of the Brazilian Labour Party.

See also

 Get%C3%BAlio Vargas#Death

References

1927 births
1984 deaths
People from São Borja
Brazilian women in politics
Brazilian journalists
Brazilian Labour Party (current) politicians
Brazilian Democratic Movement politicians
Brazilian Labour Party (historical) politicians
People from Rio Grande do Sul
Ivete Vargas
Members of the Chamber of Deputies (Brazil) from São Paulo
20th-century journalists